The women's 1000 metres speed skating competition of the 2018 Winter Olympics was held at Gangneung Oval in Gangneung on 14 February 2018.

Summary
Jorien ter Mors became the Olympic champion, continuing the trend that all 2018 Olympic gold medals in speed skating up to this event were won by Dutch skaters. Nao Kodaira became second, and Miho Takagi was third, two days after her silver medal in the 1500m event.

The defending champion was Zhang Hong, and the 2014 silver medalist, Ireen Wüst, was also competing. Wüst took an early lead in 4th pair, and stayed on top until in 12th pair Jorien ter Mors skated an olympic record, and the time of Brittany Bowe in the same pair was still better than that of Wüst. In 14th pair, Miho Takagi posted the time between these of ter Mors and Bowe, shifting Bowe to the bronze medal position. In 15th pair Nao Kodaira, the world record holder at this distance, had a time behind than of ten Mors but below the former Olympic record of Chris Witty, shifting Takagi to the bronze medal position. There was one pair to go, but Marrit Leenstra only finished sixth, not changing the order of medals.

Records
Prior to this competition, the existing world and Olympic records were as follows.

The following records were set during this competition.

OR = Olympic record, TR = track record

Results
The competition started at 19:00.

References

Women's speed skating at the 2018 Winter Olympics